Step Up to the Plate is a 2008 United Kingdom-based television programme, produced by Endemol, for the BBC. It was hosted by Anton du Beke and Loyd Grossman

Format
Three amateur cooks were pitched against two professional chefs, to cook a three course meal designed by the amateur cooks. Loyd Grosman stepped up to the plate to judge the courses. The amateur cooks stood to win a prize fund of at least £5000. Whenever the chefs won the fund would increase by £1000.

Broadcast
The programme was broadcast on BBC1 and BBC2 in two runs during 2008.

References

External links
 
 

2008 British television series debuts
2008 British television series endings
BBC high definition shows
BBC Television shows
British cooking television shows
Television series by Endemol
English-language television shows